Thomas Johnston (October 30, 1821 – July 30, 1903) was a merchant, ship owner and political figure in Nova Scotia, Canada. He represented Shelburne County in the Nova Scotia House of Assembly from 1867 to 1878 and from 1882 to 1897 as a Liberal member. His name also appears as Thomas Johnson in some sources.

He was born in Shelburne, Nova Scotia, the son of Thomas Johnston. In 1866, he married Jerusha, widow of Captain R.D. Todd. Johnston served seven years as sheriff for Shelburne. In 1882, he was named to the province's Executive Council. He died in Halifax at the age of 81.

References 

1821 births
1903 deaths
Nova Scotia Liberal Party MLAs